Cowie Dome is a dome-shaped summit at the east side of Bartlett Glacier, located  directly west of Lee Peak in the Queen Maud Mountains. It was mapped by the United States Geological Survey from surveys and from U.S. Navy air photos, 1960–64, and named by the New Zealand Antarctic Place-Names Committee for George Donald Cowie, the leader of the New Zealand Geological Survey Antarctic Expedition which visited the region in 1969–70.

References 

Mountains of the Ross Dependency
Amundsen Coast